Marius Zibolis (14 October 1974 – 18 January 2023) was a Lithuanian goalball player who competed in international elite competitions. He was a double Paralympic silver medalist and a four-time European champion.

References 

1974 births
2023 deaths
People from Vilkaviškis
Paralympic goalball players of Lithuania
Goalball players at the 2000 Summer Paralympics
Goalball players at the 2004 Summer Paralympics
Goalball players at the 2008 Summer Paralympics
Goalball players at the 2012 Summer Paralympics
Medalists at the 2000 Summer Paralympics
Medalists at the 2008 Summer Paralympics
Goalball players at the 2020 Summer Paralympics